Bad River may refer:

Rivers
 Bad River (Michigan), a tributary of the Shiawassee River in the US
 Bad River (South Dakota), a tributary of the Missouri River in the US
 Bad River (Wisconsin), flowing into Lake Superior in the US
 Bad River (British Columbia), a tributary of the Fraser River

Other uses
 Bad River Band of the Lake Superior Tribe of Chippewa Indians
 Bad River Train Blockade, a 1996 action on the Bad River reservation